Recep Tayyip Erdoğan Stadium (also known as Kasımpaşa Stadium) is a multi-use stadium in the Kasımpaşa neighbourhood of Istanbul, Turkey. It is currently used mostly for football matches, and is the home stadium of Kasımpaşa S.K. The stadium capacity was extended to 14,234 spectators. Due to extension works, Kasımpaşa played most of its home matches in the Atatürk Olympic Stadium in the 2007–2008 season. It is named after the incumbent Turkish President Recep Tayyip Erdoğan, a native of Kasımpaşa and a football player in his youth.

Gallery

References

External links 

 Satellite Photo of Recep Tayyip Erdoğan Stadium
 Current Photo of Recep Tayyip Erdoğan Stadium
 Various Pictures

Sports venues in Istanbul
Kasımpaşa S.K.
Süper Lig venues
Buildings and structures in Beyoğlu
Recep Tayyip Erdoğan
Multi-purpose stadiums in Turkey
2005 establishments in Turkey
Sports venues completed in 2005